"Cash Shit" is a song by American rapper Megan Thee Stallion, featuring vocals from American rapper DaBaby. It was released on May 17, 2019, as the third single off of Megan Thee Stallion's first commercial mixtape, Fever. The track would later peak at number one on Urban radio in the United States, as well as number 36 on the Billboard Hot 100. This song was later featured in the fictional iFruit Radio in Grand Theft Auto V (Xbox One, PS4, PC version).

Billboard magazine ranked "Cash Shit" thirtieth on their 100 Best Songs of 2019 list. Complex named it the eleventh best song of the year, while Pitchfork listed it twelfth on their 100 Best Songs of 2019 list.

Music and lyrics 
"Cash Shit" is a hip hop song that features a booming beat. In the intro of the song, Megan raps "Yeah, I'm in my bag, but I'm in his too", a line Pitchforks Rawiya Kameir labeled as "capitalist-feminism". In Megan's opening verse, she twice "interrupts herself and jumps back a few bars to repeat her punchlines". Complex's Shawn Setaro said the song contains the "best elements from both artists: Megan's humor and in-your-face sexuality, and DaBaby's flowing triplet rhythms and perfectly timed pauses."

Critical reception
"Cash Shit" received acclaim from critics, with many praising Megan Thee Stallion's and DaBaby's verses. The song was given a "VERY HOTTTTT" rating by Milca P. of HotNewHipHop, and was labeled "an effort laced in impalpable swagger and confidence." Writing for Tiny Mix Tapes, Eli Schoop praised the song as "downright nasty". In a review of Fever by The New York Times, and praised the line "I'm a finesser and I'm a fly dresser/Move to the top floor and flew in my dresser" as "an unlikely image crash landing into a conventional boast". Trent Clark of HipHopDX praised Megan's and DaBaby's performances, saying that the song "highlights why both Southern stars are among the most entertaining rappers out"

The song's production also received praise, with The New York Times calling it "ominous and spacious" and The Fader branding it as "refined".

Music video 
Two "much-hyped" music videos were teased, but subsequently abandoned. On July 14, Megan released a trailer via social media (featuring DaBaby) of what appeared to be a trailer for a short film/music video, directed by Hype Williams, titled "Fever Thee Movie". Later in May 2020, Megan confirmed that if her song "Savage" goes number 1 on the Billboard Hot 100, she would drop the video/short film.

Charts

Weekly charts

Year-end charts

Certifications

References

2019 singles
2019 songs
300 Entertainment singles
DaBaby songs
Megan Thee Stallion songs
Songs written by DaBaby
Songs written by Megan Thee Stallion